Alaševce is a village in the municipality of Lipkovo, North Macedonia.

History
Descendants of the Krasniqi fis were recorded in the villages of Gošince, Slupčane, Alaševce and Runica in 1965.

Demographics
As of the 2021 census, Alaševce had 89 residents with the following ethnic composition:
Albanians 84
Persons for whom data are taken from administrative sources 5

According to the 2002 census, the village had a total of 126 inhabitants. Ethnic groups in the village include:
Albanians 119
Others 7

References

Villages in Lipkovo Municipality
Albanian communities in North Macedonia